John McEnroe was the defending champion.

McEnroe successfully defended his title, defeating Ivan Lendl, 6–3, 3–6, 6–3, 7–6 in the final.

Seeds

  Ivan Lendl (final)
  John McEnroe (champion)
  Yannick Noah (semifinals)
  Jimmy Arias (quarterfinals)
  Bill Scanlon (second round)
  Kevin Curren (withdrew)
  Gene Mayer (second round)
  Eliot Teltscher (quarterfinals)
  Johan Kriek (third round)
  Tim Mayotte (second round)
  Tomáš Šmíd(quarterfinals)
  Brian Gottfried (second round)
  Henrik Sundström (second round)
  Heinz Günthardt (third round)
  Scott Davis (third round)
  Henri Leconte (third round)

Draw

Finals

Top half

Section 1

Section 2

Bottom half

Section 3

Section 4

References

 Main Draw

U.S. Pro Indoor
1984 Grand Prix (tennis)